Ricardo Almeida Ribeiro (born 9 May 1997), known as Almeida, is a Portuguese professional footballer who plays for G.D. Fontinhas as a forward.

Club career
Born in Guimarães, Almeida played three Primeira Liga matches for Moreirense F.C. over three separate seasons, totalling roughly 30 minutes always as a second-half substitute. His first was on 23 May 2015, in a 2–1 away win against F.C. Arouca.

Almeida was loaned to LigaPro side Sporting CP B for two years on 5 August 2016, with a buying option. He scored his first goal in that league nine days later, equalising an eventual 2–1 away victory over S.C. Covilhã.

Subsequently, Almeida represented clubs in the third division, starting out at Berço SC (still owned by Moreirense) then switching to A.R.C. Oleiros in the summer of 2020.

References

External links

Portuguese League profile 

1997 births
Living people
Sportspeople from Guimarães
Portuguese footballers
Association football forwards
Primeira Liga players
Liga Portugal 2 players
Campeonato de Portugal (league) players
G.D. Serzedelo players
Moreirense F.C. players
Sporting CP B players
A.R.C. Oleiros players
A.R. São Martinho players
Portugal youth international footballers